Erik Henriksen (born April 8, 1958) is an American speed skater. He competed at the 1984 Winter Olympics and the 1988 Winter Olympics.

References

1958 births
Living people
American male speed skaters
Olympic speed skaters of the United States
Speed skaters at the 1984 Winter Olympics
Speed skaters at the 1988 Winter Olympics
Sportspeople from Champaign, Illinois